Värner Lootsmann (born August 18, 1945 in Kasispea) is an Estonian Politician from Harju County.

Political Activity
Lootsmann was a member of the Estonian Liberal Democratic Party in 199091 and has been a member of the Estonian Centre Party since 1992. From 20062009 he was the county governor of Harju County

Sources
 (Estonian) 
  
 (Estonian) 
 (Estonian) 

1945 births
Living people
People from Kuusalu Parish
Estonian Centre Party politicians
Members of the Riigikogu, 1999–2003
Members of the Riigikogu, 2003–2007
21st-century Estonian politicians